Juan de Dios de Silva y Mendoza y Haro (13 November 1672 – 9 December 1737), was a Spanish noble from the House of Mendoza. He was the 10th Duke of the Infantado, the 8th Duke of Lerma and the 6th Duke of Pastrana.

Family origins 

Juan was the son of Gregorio María de Silva y Mendoza (1649–1693), 9th Duke of the Infantado from whom he inherited the title, and his wife, Doña María de Haro y Guzmán (1644–1693), daughter of Luis Méndez de Haro, the first minister of Philip IV of Spain and Catalina Fernández de Córdoba y Aragón. He was a member of the powerful House of Mendoza which had controlled the Dukedom of the Infantado since its inception with Diego Hurtado de Mendoza y Figueroa. The Mendoza family rose to power when it merged with the House of Lasso de la Vega through the marriage of Leonor Lasso de la Vega, the last direct member of that line, and Admiral Diego Hurtado de Mendoza, the admiral of Castile.

References 

1672 births
1737 deaths
10
Juan de Dios
Juan de Dios